Meijer is a Dutch surname. It refers to a profession similar to a bailiff or steward. It originates from the Latin word maior and is often rendered Meyer abroad.

As of 2007, there were 39,801 people with the surname Meijer in the Netherlands.

People named Meijer
Annita Meijer (born 1954), professionally known as Anita Meyer, Dutch singer
Arnold Meijer (1905–1965), Dutch fascist politician
Bengt Meijer, Swedish footballer
Bert Meijer (born 1955), Dutch organic chemist
Berthe Meijer (1938–2012), German-born Dutch Holocaust survivor and author
Clara Meijer-Wichmann (1885–1922), German–Dutch lawyer, writer, and anarchist
Connie Meijer (1963–1988), Dutch racing cyclist
Cornelis Simon Meijer (1904–1974), Dutch mathematician who introduced the Meijer G-function
Doug Meijer (born 1955), American businessman, son of Frederik Meijer
Eduard Meijer (1878–1929), Dutch swimmer and water polo player
Elien Meijer (born 1970), Dutch rower
Erik Meijer (politician) (born 1944), Dutch politician
Erik Meijer (computer scientist) (born 1963), Dutch computer scientist
Erik Meijer (footballer) (born 1969), Dutch football winger and manager
Fik Meijer (born 1942), Dutch historian and author
Frans Meijer (criminal) (born 1953), Dutch kidnapper 
Frank Nicolaas Meijer (1875–1918), Dutch-born American explorer and botanist
 (born 1960), Dutch voice actor
Frederik Meijer (also known as Fred Meijer; 1919–2011), American businessman, son of Hendrik
Geert Meijer (born 1951), Dutch footballer
Geertruida Wijsmuller-Meijer (née Truus Meijer; 1896–1978), Dutch war hero and resistance fighter
 (born 1962), Dutch physical chemist
Han Meijer (born 1949), Dutch mechanical engineer and polymer chemist 
Hank Meijer (born 1952), American businessman, son of Frederik Meijer
Hendrik Meijer (1883–1964), Dutch-born American businessman, founder of the Meijer hypermarket chain
Henk Meijer (born 1959), Dutch taekwondo competitor and coach
Henny Meijer (born 1962), Surinamese-Dutch football forward
Herma Meijer (born 1969), Dutch speed skater
 (born 1947), Dutch GreenLeft politician
Ischa Meijer (1943–1995), Dutch journalist, radio presenter, and author
Jaap Meijer (1905–1943), Dutch track cyclist
Jaap Meijer (writer) (1912–1993), Dutch historian and poet
Jan Meijer (1921–1993), Dutch sprinter
Johnny Meijer (1912–1992), Dutch accordionist
Jonas Daniel Meijer (1780–1834), Dutch lawyer
Karel Meijer (1884–1967), Dutch water polo player
Klaasje Meijer (born 1995), Dutch pop singer
Larissa Meijer (born 1990),  Dutch field hockey goalkeeper
Lavinia Meijer (born 1983), Dutch harpist
Leo Meijer (1873–1944), German film producer
Leonie Meijer (born 1985), Dutch singer and songwriter
Lodewijk Meijer (1629–1681), Dutch physician, scholar, playwright and Enlightenment radical 
Louis Meijer (1809–1866), Dutch painter, etcher, lithographer, and draftsman
Lukas Meijer (born 1988), Swedish rock musician
Markus Meijer (born 1970), Dutch real estate investor, son of Ton Meijer
Mary Meijer-van der Sluis (1917–1994), Dutch fencer
Michaela Meijer (born 1993), Swedish pole vaulter
Patrick Meijer (born 1973), Dutch stand-up comedian
Paul Meijer (born 1985), Dutch racing driver
Peter Meijer (born 1988), American politician, son of Hank Meijer
Rogier Meijer (born 1981), Dutch footballer
Sal Meijer (1877–1965), Dutch painter
Sebastian Meijer (born 1984), Swedish ice hockey winger
Selma Meijer (1890–1941), Dutch pacifist, feminist and resistance fighter
Stijn Meijer (born 1999), Dutch footballer
Tamara Meijer (born 1979), Dutch judoka
Theo Meijer (born 1965), Dutch judoka
Ton Meijer, Dutch property developer, father of Markus Meijer
Truus Meijer (1896–1978), Dutch war hero and resistance fighter
Willem Meijer (1923–2003), Dutch botanist
Wim Meijer (Pacifist Socialist Party) (1923–2001), Dutch politician
Wim Meijer (Labour Party) (born 1939), Dutch politician

De Meijer
Hendrick de Meijer (1620–1689), Dutch landscape painter
 (1915–2000), Dutch KVP politician
Sadiqa de Meijer (born 1977), Canadian poet

Compound names
Tippy de Lanoy Meijer (born 1943), Dutch field hockey player
Willem van Walt Meijer (born 1958), Dutch sailor

As a given name
Meijer de Haan (1852–1895), Dutch Pont-Aven School painter
Meijer Marcusz Roest (1821–1889), Dutch bibliographer

See also
Meijers (surname)
Meyer (disambiguation)

References

Dutch-language surnames
Occupational surnames